Senator Barnes may refer to:

Charles N. Barnes (1860–1932), Illinois State Senate
Clark Barnes (born 1950), West Virginia State Senate
Henson P. Barnes (1934–2015), North Caroline State Senate
John Barnes (Australian politician) (1868–1938), Senate of Australia
John R. Barnes (1833–1919), Utah State Senate
John Barnes Jr. (born 1931), New Hampshire State Senate
Julius Steele Barnes (1792–1870), Connecticut State Senate
Monica Barnes (1936–2018), Senate of Ireland
Peter J. Barnes III (born 1956), New Jersey State Senate
Roy Barnes (born 1948), Georgia State Senate
Stan Barnes (politician) (born 1961), Arizona State Senate
Tim Barnes (politician) (born 1958), Tennessee State Senate
Tina Rose Muña Barnes (born 1962), Senate of Guam
William D. Barnes (1856–1927), New York State Senate